1st Military Intelligence Battalion (Aerial Exploitation), nicknamed the "Flying Eye Battalion", is a unit of the United States Army which specializes in the acquisition of aerial signals information in direct support of the 66th Military Intelligence Brigade. 1st MI Battalion (AE) is currently headquartered at Lucius D. Clay Kaserne in Germany.

Battalion history
The unit was originally formed on 14 December 1956 as Headquarters and Headquarters Detachment, 1st Air Reconnaissance Support Battalion, and formally activated 1 February 1957 at Fort Polk, Louisiana. It was reorganized and redesignated 1 May 1959 as Company A, 196th Aerial Photo Interpretation Detachment at Fort Bragg, North Carolina. Then on 20 March 1962 it was converted and redesignated the 1st Military Intelligence Battalion (Air Reconnaissance Support). In October 1962 the 1st Military Intelligence Battalion (ARS) was instrumental in identifying Russian missile activity from clear photographic evidence produced from Air Force U-2 Spy Planes. Upon its return from Vietnam in 1973, 1st MI was assigned to Fort Bragg, North Carolina and eventually inactivated 15 July 1982. 
Reactivated 14 January 1984 in Germany as V Corps' aerial exploitation battalion, 1st MI is currently assigned to the 66th Military Intelligence Brigade out of Lucius D. Clay Kaserne, Wiesbaden, Germany, and supported Operation Enduring Freedom in Afghanistan.

1st MI Battalion has served in
 the Korean War, as Company A, 196th Aerial Photo Interpretation Detachment, which was formed 10 July 1945 at Fort Jackson, South Carolina
 the Vietnam War, as 1st Military Intelligence Battalion (ARS) (MIBARS)
 Operation Desert Storm
 Operation Joint Endeavor
 Operation Joint Guard
 Operation Joint Forge
 Operation Joint Guardian
 Operation Noble Anvil
 Operation Iraqi Freedom
 Operation Enduring Freedom

Current unit organization
The battalion has undergone various reorganizations. Currently it comprises four companies:
 Headquarters and Headquarters Service Company – Runs battalion command and control and provides logistics support
 Company A – Provides aerial images through the use of the Hunter Unmanned Aerial Vehicle
 Company B – Produces SIGINT collection and Aerial Electronic Warfare with the Guardrail Common Sensor
 Company C – Conducts analysis and dissemination of SIGINT

Vietnam unit organization
The unit served in Vietnam from 23 December 1965 from Ft. Bragg and departed Vietnam on 19 April 1971 to return to Ft. Bragg, as 1st Military Intelligence Battalion (Air Reconnaissance Support)(MIBARS). Detachments were stationed in multiple locations during the battalion's deployment. Each detachment consisted of an operations/imagery interpretation section, a reproduction section and a supply and maintenance section.
 
Headquarters and Headquarters Company was based in Saigon at Muscara Compound. It included an aviation platoon ("The Good Guys").
Detachment A was based at Biên Hòa and supported III Corps operations.
Detachment B was based at Da Nang and supported I Corps operations.
Detachment C was based at Cần Thơ and supported IV Corps operations.
Detachment D was based at Nha Trang and supported II Corps operations.
45th Military Intelligence Detachment was assigned to 1st MI Battalion in 1968 and was based in Phu Bai. It was eventually organized as Detachment E and supported operations in I Corps.

Decorations
The following decorations have been awarded to the 1st Military Intelligence Battalion:

Presidential Unit Citation (Air Force) for Southeast Asia 1966–1967
Meritorious Unit Commendation (Army) for Vietnam 1965–1966
Meritorious Unit Commendation (Army) for Vietnam 1966–1967
Meritorious Unit Commendation (Army) for Vietnam 1967–1968
Meritorious Unit Commendation (Army) for Vietnam 1969–1970
Meritorious Unit Commendation (Army) for Vietnam 1970–1972
Meritorious Unit Commendation (Army) for Iraq 2005–2006
Meritorious Unit Commendation (Army) for Afghanistan 2007–2009
Army Superior Unit Award for 1995–1996
Army Superior Unit Award for 1999–2003
Republic of Vietnam Cross of Gallantry with Gold Star for Vietnam 1965–1971

Company A is additionally entitled to:

Meritorious Unit Commendation (Army) for Korea 1950–1952
Meritorious Unit Commendation (Army) for Korea 1953
Republic of Korea Presidential Unit Citation for Korea 1950–1952

Notes
Citations

References cited

External links
Ist MI in OEF
1st MIBARS in Vietnam
1st Military Intelligence Battalion (Aerial Exploitation) GlobalSecurity.org website

Military units and formations of the United States Army in the Vietnam War
001
Military units and formations established in 1957